Storfolk og småfolk (Important People and Common People) is a Norwegian black-and-white comedy film from 1951 directed by Tancred Ibsen. Ibsen also write the script for the film. The film is based on five stories by Hans Aanrud and the action is set in rural Norway. It follows both high and low society, including village characters, wealthy individuals, farmers, and "old timers."

The film was quite well received. Aftenposten wrote "In Mari Smehaugen and I bestefars ærend you feel something of the inner warmth and joy you had when you read the story in Aanrud's own language." Dagbladet wrote that "a number of our top actors appear and create down-to-earth theater sketches."

Cast

 Gisle Straume as Per Oppigar'n 
 Grete Anthonsen as Astrid, his daughter 
 Haakon Arnold as Lars Kampesveen 
 Snefrid Aukland as a woman in the village
 Bjarne Bø as Per Høgåsen 
 Edvard Drabløs as Grandfather
 Leif Enger as the servant
 Johan Fillinger as the girl's boyfriend
 Berit Fossum as the wife
 Maria Hald as the servant girl
 Harald Heide-Steen Jr. as Ola, the son

References

External links
 
 Storfolk og småfolk at the National Library of Norway
 Storfolk og småfolk at Filmfront

1951 films
Norwegian comedy films
Norwegian black-and-white films
Films directed by Tancred Ibsen
1950s Norwegian-language films